Matti is a given name, originated from the Hebrew Mattityahu, meaning "gift of God". It is a popular Finnish version of Matthew or Matthias. Matti (מתי) is also a short for the Yiddish Mattisyahu. It may refer to:

In sports
Matti Breschel (born 1984), Danish road bicycle racer
Matti Hagman (1955–2016), Finnish hockey player
Matti Hautamäki (born 1981), Finnish ski jumper
Matti Killing (born 1948), Estonian rowing coach
Matti Klinga (born 1994), Finnish footballer
Matti Mäki (born 1982), Finnish swimmer
Matti Niemi (rowing) (born 1937), Finnish coxswain
Matti Niemi (athlete) (born 1976), Finnish hurdler
Matti Nuutinen (born 1990), Finnish basketball player
Matti Nykänen (1963–2019), Finnish ski jumper
Matti Oivanen (born 1986), Finnish volleyball player
Matti Pitkänen (born 1948), Finnish former cross-country skier
Matti Rajakylä (born 1984), Finnish swimmer
Matti Santahuhta (born 1981), Finnish football manager and former player
Matti Wasama (1918–1970), Finnish hockey player

In music
Matti Caspi (born 1949), Israeli composer, musician, singer and lyricist
Mátti Kovler (born 1980), Israeli/American composer of music theatre
Matti Lehtinen (1922–2022), Finnish operatic baritone
Matti Salminen (born 1945), Finnish operatic bass singer

In politics
Matti Maasikas (born 1967), Estonian diplomat
Matti Mattson (1916–2011), American labor organizer, social activist, veteran of the Spanish Civil War
Matti Nikki, Finnish software developer, researcher and Internet anti-censorship activist
Matti Päts (born 1933), Estonian politician 
Matti Vanhanen (born 1955), former Prime Minister of Finland

In other fields
Matti Aarnio, (1901–1984), Finnish military officer 
Matti Friedman, Israeli-Canadian journalist and author
Matti Haapoja (1845–1895), Finnish serial killer 
Matti Klinge (born 1936), Finnish historian
Matti Kuusi (1914–1998), Finnish folklorist, paremiographer and paremiologist
Matti Pohto (1817–1857), Finnish book collector
Matti Saari, editor-in-chief of the Finnish Apu family magazine
Matti Juhani Saari (1986–2008), Finnish perpetrator of the Kauhajoki school shooting
Matti Seppälä (1941–1920), Finnish geomorphologist
Matti Åkerblom (1740–1819), Finnish church builder

See also
Vesa-Matti Loiri, Finnish actor, musician and comedian
Mati (disambiguation)

Finnish masculine given names
Informal personal names